Laconia High School is the name of some high schools in the United States:

Laconia High School (New Hampshire)
 Laconia High School (Wisconsin)